A Chief of Staff or Chiefs of Staff is defined as the senior officer of any of several services of the armed forces of several nations and may refer to:
The United States Joint Chiefs of Staff
The British Chiefs of Staff Committee
The Canadian chiefs of staff committee, replaced after Unification in 1968 by the Armed Forces Council
Chief of Staff (TV series), a 2019 South Korean television series

See also
Staff (military)
Joint Chiefs of Staff (disambiguation)
Chairman of the Joint Chiefs of Staff (disambiguation)